Jonathan Bru (born 2 May 1985) is a former professional footballer who played as a defensive midfielder. Born in France, he represented France at youth international level before playing for the Mauritius national team. He works as head coach of the Red Star reserves.

Club career

France
Born in Neuilly-sur-Seine, France, Bru played youth football at CS Brétigny, INF Clairefontaine and Stade Rennais FC. He began his professional career with the latter, making only one Ligue 1 appearance during his spell.

In the summer of 2006, Bru moved to FC Istres in Ligue 2, playing nine games in his first year and being relegated.

Cyprus and Portugal
After one season with AEP Paphos FC in the Cypriot First Division, Bru joined Académica de Coimbra in Portugal, appearing in only four official matches in his debut campaign in the Primeira Liga.

On 26 July 2010, he signed a one-year deal with Segunda Liga side U.D. Oliveirense, scoring his first goal for his new club on 23 October in a 1–1 home draw against S.C. Freamunde.

In August 2011, Bru continued in Portugal's second level, signing with Moreirense FC. He netted his first goal against his former team, the 3–2 game-winner on 2 October (away fixture).

Australia
On 20 June 2012, Bru signed a two-year deal with two-time A-League champions Melbourne Victory FC, as Ange Postecoglou's first import signing. He helped his new team to the preliminary finals in his first year by making 19 out of a possible 29 appearances, but also nearly came to blows with teammate Danny Allsopp after a training ground incident.

On 8 January 2014, after spending several weeks training on his own, Bru was released by the Victory. After almost nine months without a club, he returned to Oliveirense and the Portuguese second division.

International career
Bru represented France in almost every youth team, but never made an appearance for the senior side. In June 2009, he told Mauritian newspaper L'Express that he hoped to play one day for Mauritius, since both of his parents were born in the country; this became a reality when Mauritius head coach Akbar Patel called him to the squad for the 2012 Africa Cup of Nations qualifying campaign.

Bru made his debut on 4 September 2010 in a 3–1 defeat at the hands of Cameroon, scoring the national team's goal through a penalty kick. His second goal came on 5 June of the following year against DR Congo, also for the ACN qualifiers and from the penalty spot.

In August 2011, Bru was called up by Mauritius for the 2011 Indian Ocean Island Games, and played in all of the matches en route to the final, a loss to Seychelles on penalties.

Managerial career 
In August 2022 Bru was appointed head coach of the reserve team of Paris-based club Red Star.

Personal life 
Bru's younger brother, Kévin, is also a footballer midfielder. He spent most of his career in France – with a lengthy spell in England with Ipswich Town – and also represented Mauritius internationally.

Career statistics

International goals
Scores and results list Mauritius' goal tally first, score column indicates score after each Bru goal.

Honours
Indian Ocean Island Games: Runner-up 2011

References

External links

1985 births
Living people
French people of Mauritian descent
Sportspeople from Neuilly-sur-Seine
French footballers
Mauritian footballers
Footballers from Hauts-de-Seine
Association football midfielders
Mauritius international footballers
France under-21 international footballers
France youth international footballers
Ligue 1 players
Ligue 2 players
Championnat National players
INF Clairefontaine players
Stade Rennais F.C. players
FC Istres players
AS Poissy players
Cypriot First Division players
AEP Paphos FC players
Primeira Liga players
Liga Portugal 2 players
Associação Académica de Coimbra – O.A.F. players
U.D. Oliveirense players
Moreirense F.C. players
A-League Men players
Melbourne Victory FC players
French football managers
Mauritian football managers
Mauritian expatriate footballers
Mauritian expatriate sportspeople in Cyprus
Expatriate footballers in Cyprus
Mauritian expatriate sportspeople in Portugal
Expatriate footballers in Portugal
Mauritian expatriate sportspeople in Australia
Expatriate soccer players in Australia